The Untouchable Tour was the third headlining concert tour by American singer-songwriter Meghan Trainor. It was launched in support of her second major-label studio album Thank You (2016), and consisted of concerts in North America and Europe. The tour was announced in April 2016, with dates being released at the same time. The show was produced by Live Nation Entertainment. The set list featured the majority of the songs from Thank You, all four singles from Trainor's debut major-label studio album Title (2015), "All About That Bass", "Lips Are Movin", "Dear Future Husband" and "Like I'm Gonna Lose You", and a cover of Drake's song "One Dance" (2016). The tour was positively received by most critics.

Background and development
On April 20, 2016, Meghan Trainor announced her third concert tour, The Untouchable Tour, to support her second major-label studio album, Thank You (2016). Tour dates were released on the same day and tickets were released on April 29, 2016. Live Nation Entertainment was announced as the tour's producers, while Lip Smacker, Tampax and Always were the sponsors. The set list included sixteen songs from Thank You, all four singles from Trainor's debut major-label studio album Title (2015), "All About That Bass", "Lips Are Movin", "Dear Future Husband" and "Like I'm Gonna Lose You", and a cover of Drake's song "One Dance" (2016).

Synopsis and reception 
Trainor would start the hour and a half long concert with a performance of "Woman Up". She thanked her mother before her performance of "Mom". At her Seattle show, wearing an "elegant, black and glittering" gown, she stated "My momma couldn't be here tonight because she's probably doing a million things for me, but I wouldn't be here without her. Best mom ever!" A green screen in the backdrop would project a clip of Trainor dancing with her father during her performance of "Dance Like Yo Daddy", for which he would join Trainor on some dates. Pictures of Trainor with her friends were projected on the screen during the "Friends" performance. She would be accompanied by a saxophonist and a trumpet player. Trainor played a ukulele during her performance of "Just a Friend to You". The "Kindly Calm Me Down" performance would incorporate four background dancers. Trainor performed "Like I'm Gonna Lose You", and a cover of Drake's "One Dance" on some dates. The set would include three costume changes. Trainor's band was a seven-piece ensemble: bass, drums, keys, trumpet, sax, and rhythm and lead guitarists.

Shawn Costa of MassLive praised the show, writing that "performing for a near-capacity crowd, Trainor put on a high-energy show". The tour was ranked sixth on MTV News' list of "16 Concert Tours You Absolutely Can't Miss This Summer". Billboards William Goodman gave the show a positive review, describing it as an ode to Trainor's friends and family. Lauren Craddock from the same magazine was also favorable, writing that Trainor "packed the house with immense energy and self confidence, engaging with her fans throughout the show". Entertainment Weekly's Kevin O'Donnell gave the show a mixed review, writing that it is "flawlessly executed" but "a little too rooted in Vaudevillian clichés".

Set list
Set list for the July 22, 2016, show.

 "Woman Up"
 "Watch Me Do"
 "Me Too"
 "Dear Future Husband"
 "Lips Are Movin"
 "Mom"
 "Dance Like Yo Daddy"
 "All About That Bass"
 "Friends"
 "Kindly Calm Me Down"
 "Hopeless Romantic"
 "Just a Friend to You"
 "Like I'm Gonna Lose You"
 "Throwback Love"
 "I Love Me"
 "Champagne Problems"
 "I Won't Let You Down"
 "One Dance" 
 "Better"
 "Thank You"

Encore
"No"

Notes
During the September 9 show in New York City, Trainor's cover of "One Dance" was omitted, and "Bang Dem Sticks" and "Good to be Alive" were added to the setlist.
During the July 22 show in Los Angeles, Trainor was joined by James Corden for the "Like I'm Gonna Lose You" performance and added "Good to be Alive" to the setlist.

Tour dates

Notes

References

2016 concert tours
Meghan Trainor concert tours